Our Body is a 2018 South Korean drama film written, directed and edited by Han Ka-ram in her debut feature film.

Plot
The film follows a young woman, Ja-young, who struggles to find her purpose in life. One day, Ja-young encounters a determined runner and develops a fascination with modeling her life after the runner.

Cast
Choi Hee-seo as Ja-young
Ahn Ji-hye as Hyun-joo
Kim Jung-young
Park Sayon

Release 
The film had its world premiere in the Discovery section of the 2018 Toronto International Film Festival, held from 6 to 16 September 2018. It was then screened at the 23rd edition of the Busan International Film Festival in October 2018.

Reception
Reviewing it for Screendaily, Jason Bechervaise called it an "impressive feature debut", with Choi Hee-seo delivering "a nuanced and dedicated performance". While Variety's Jessica Kiang says, "a promising but almost willfully obscure debut" and "a convincing but underpowered exploration of female identity and alienation in status-and-youth-obsessed contemporary Seoul".

Awards and nominations

References

External links

 

2018 films
2018 drama films
South Korean drama films
2018 directorial debut films
2010s South Korean films